Cerithiopsis cinereoflava is a species of sea snail, a gastropod in the family Cerithiopsidae. It was described by Mörch in 1876.

References

cinereoflava
Gastropods described in 1876